Kaldırım may refer to:

 Kaldırım, Kayapınar
 Kaldırım, Yumurtalık, a village in Adana Province, Turkey
 Kalderimi, a cobblestone-paved road

People with the surname
 Hasan Ali Kaldırım, Turkish footballer

Turkish-language surnames